Fazail Rahim ogly Agamali (born 27 August 1947, Sisian, Armenian SSR), is an Azerbaijani politician, historian and professor with a D.Sc. academic degree. He is the founder and leader of the Motherland Party. Agamali is a Member of the National Assembly of Azerbaijan since 1995. He served as Deputy and Acting Minister of Labour and Social Protection of the Population between 1992 and 1994.

Early life

Fazail Agamali was born in the Sisian district of Armenian SSR on 27 August 1947. He got his first education in Dastakert high school.

He has completed his undergraduate studies at Baku State University between 1966 and 1971. During his studies, Agamali has become a member of the secret anti-Soviet student organization, which was demanding independence to Azerbaijan.

In the early 70s, the KGB has constantly monitored him due to his anti-Soviet activities.

Academic career
In 1972, Fazail Agamali was admitted to the graduate school of Baku State University and in 1980, he received the academic degree of Candidate of Historical Sciences.

He has given lectures in Nakhchivan State University, Azerbaijan Technological University and Azerbaijan State University of Economics as an associate professor from 1973 to 1990.

In 2005, Fazail Agamali obtained the D.Sc academic degree in history.

Political career

Early political career
Fazail Agamali took an active role in the independence movement in Azerbaijan between 1988 and 1990 and he was a prominent figure of the Azerbaijan Popular Front. However, several controversies arose between him and other movement leaders after the Black January incidents. The process concluded with the resignation of Fazail Agamali from the Popular Front. After these developments, supporters of Agamali demanded the formation of a new political party. Hence, on 24 November 1990 founding congress of the Motherland Party took place and Fazail Agamali was elected as the chairman of the party.

In the cabinet
Fazail Agamali had served as Deputy Minister of Labour and Social Protection of the Population in 1992–1993 and Acting Minister of Labour and Social Protection of the Population in 1993–1994.

In the parliament
Fazail Agamali has been elected as the Member of the National Assembly of Azerbaijan in 1995, 2000, 2005, 2010, 2015, 2020 parliamentary elections.

Agamali is a member of the Committee on Legal Policy and State Building, and deputy chairman of the Disciplinary Commission of the Member of the National Assembly of Azerbaijan. Furthermore, he is the leader of the Working Group for the Azerbaijani-Turkmen Interparliamentary Relations.

Personal life
Fazail Agamali is married and has three children.

Awards
On 25 August 2017, MP Fazail Agamali was awarded Shohrat Order by the President of Azerbaijan. Agamali was awarded For service to the Fatherland Order on 25 August 2022  by the President of Azerbaijan.

See also
Motherland Party
Politics of Azerbaijan

References 

Living people
1947 births
Members of the National Assembly (Azerbaijan)
Azerbaijani politicians
Azerbaijani professors